The 1991–92 ice hockey Bundesliga season was the 34th season of the Ice hockey Bundesliga, the top level of ice hockey in Germany. 12 teams participated in the league, and Düsseldorfer EG won the championship.

First round

Play-downs

First round

Second round

Relegation

Playoffs

Quarterfinals

Semifinals

Final

References

External links
Season on hockeyarchives.info

Eishockey-Bundesliga seasons
Ger
Bundesliga